National Weather Service Paducah is a weather forecast office responsible for monitoring weather conditions for 58 counties in the states of Kentucky, Illinois, Indiana and Missouri. The Paducah office is relatively new compared to others, having been built in 1984. The office is in charge of weather forecasts, warnings and local statements as well as aviation weather. It is also equipped with a WSR-88D (NEXRAD) radar, and an Automated Surface Observing System (ASOS) that greatly increase the ability to forecast.

NOAA Weather Radio
 
National Weather Service Paducah Forecast Office in Paducah, Kentucky provides programming for 11 NOAA Weather Radio stations.

KXI52 McLeansboro

KXI52 broadcasts weather and hazard information for Gallatin, Hamilton, Saline & White counties in Illinois.

WXM49 Marion

WXM49 broadcasts weather and hazard information for Alexander, Franklin, Hardin, Jackson, Johnson, Massac, Perry, Pope, Pulaski, Massac, Saline, Union, & Williamson counties in Illinois as well as Ballard County in Kentucky.

KIG76 Evansville

KIG76 broadcasts weather and hazard information for Edwards, Wabash & White counties in Illinois; Dubois, Gibson, Perry, Pike, Posey, Spencer, Vanderburgh & Warrick counties in Indiana; as well as Henderson & Union counties in Kentucky.

KIH46 Mayfield

KIH46 broadcasts weather and hazard information for Massac & Pope counties in Illinois; Ballard, Calloway, Carlisle, Crittenden, Fulton, Graves, Hickman, Livingston, Lyon, Marshall, McCracken & Trigg counties in Kentucky; Mississippi county in Missouri; as well as Henry & Weakley counties in Tennessee.

KXI26 Hopkinsville

KXI26 broadcasts weather and hazard information for Christian, Todd, & Trigg counties in Kentucky.

KZZ61 Whitesville

KZZ61 broadcasts weather and hazard information for Perry & Spencer counties in Indiana; as well as Daviess, Hancock, & Ohio counties in Kentucky.

WXJ91 Madisonville

WXJ91 broadcasts weather and hazard information for Caldwell, Christian, Crittenden, Daviess, Henderson, Hopkins, Lyon, McLean, Muhlenberg, Todd, Trigg, Union & Webster counties in Kentucky.

KXI66 Piedmont

KXI66 broadcasts weather and hazard information for Butler, Carter, Reynolds, Ripley & Wayne counties in Missouri.

KXI93 Cape Girardeau

KXI93 broadcasts weather and hazard information for Bollinger, Cape Girardeau, Mississippi, Perry & Scott counties in Missouri; as well as Alexander & Union counties in Illinois.

WWG48 Doniphan

WWG48 broadcasts weather and hazard information for Butler, Carter,  Ripley & Wayne counties in Missouri.

WXL47 Bloomfield

WXL47 broadcasts weather and hazard information for Butler, Dunklin, Mississippi, New Madrid, Scott, Stoddard & Wayne counties in Missouri.

References

External links
Paducah Office Main Page
NOAA Weather Radio Coverage Maps

Buildings and structures in Paducah, Kentucky
Paducah, Kentucky